"Sun and Moon" is a song by American artist Anees, released on April 6, 2022, as the lead single from his debut album, Summer Camp. The song was written by Anees alongside songwriters Kevin Spears, Sekko, and Zach Matari.    

A remix featuring Filipino musician JRoa was released to streaming platforms on April 14. The song then gained popularity in the Philippines, especially on TikTok. "Sun and Moon" climbed to number one on Billboard Philippines Songs, staying at its peak for five weeks as the first international song to top the chart. An official music video was released on April 21.

Background

Original 
In November 2021, Anees previewed the chorus of "Sun and Moon" to his social media accounts to positive response, leaning into R&B and a departure from his rap sound. He released "Too Good to Be True" featuring Kevin Spears as a follow-up to this new style, with Spears producing both tracks. Anees continued to preview snippets of the track before being released officially to streaming platforms on April 6 and confirming it as his lead single for his debut album.

Remix 
To promote the song, Anees launched an open verse challenge on TikTok upon its official release. On April 11, former Ex Battalion member JRoa uploaded his version to the site, gaining massive popularity locally, reaching 14 million plays as of May 2022. Anees reached out to JRoa to record a full duet to the song, releasing the official "Sun and Moon" remix on April 14 with an accompanying live performance video of both acts performing from different locations.

Lyrics and composition 
Anees announced that "Sun and Moon" is a tribute to love and adoration, adding "it's about whoever you love."

Music critics described the song as a guitar-driven R&B-pop track. Baby A. Gil of Philstar defined its sound as "light pop melody with a touch of R&B and includes a very pronounced hook". Lyrically, "Sun and Moon" is defined as a juxtaposition of ideas, depicting feelings of longing and regret, vengeance and satisfaction, selfishness and sacrifice, fortune and fate.

Commercial performance 
After the release of its official remix and music video, "Sun and Moon" debuted at number three on Billboard Philippines Songs on April 26, 2022 – for the week ending dated April 30, 2022 – becoming Anees' first entry on the chart. The song rose to number-one on the chart dated May 7, making "Sun and Moon" the first English song to reach the summit and Anees as the first international artist to top the list. On Spotify Philippines, the song gathered 509,869 streams on April 29, marking the highest daily Philippine streams of a track so far in 2022. As of May 2022, the track has gained 20 million streams on Spotify, becoming Anees' most streamed song. Elsewhere, "Sun and Moon" peaked at the top 10 of the daily chart of Spotify UAE.

Music video 
The music video for "Sun and Moon" was released on April 21. In the clip, Anees serenades a girl seated at the audience from onstage, ending in applause. The video was directed by Issa Kaddissi and has received over 7.8 million views as of June 2022.

Live performances and other versions 
Anees performed "Sun and Moon" live for the first time months before its release on January 20 at Bar Lubitsch, Los Angeles, United States. An acoustic version of the song was released with Zach Matari on guitar on May 3 to his YouTube account.

Following the popularity of the remix, rapper Matthaios contributed to the open verse challenge of the song on TikTok. Several Filipino artists have covered the song, including Justin Vasquez, Arthur Miguel, and BGYO.

Credits and personnel 
Credits are adapted from Anees official site.

 Anees Mokhiber – lead vocals, songwriter, producer
 Kevin Spears - producer, songwriter
 Wessel Okhes - songwriter
 Zach Matari - producer, songwriter
 John Roa - rap, vocals, songwriter (remix)

Charts

In popular culture 
The song is also known in the Philippines as the "official school hymn" of a satirical educational institution and Internet meme named the "International State College of the Philippines".

Release history

References

External links 

 Anees - Sun and Moon (Official Video) on YouTube
 Anees - Sun and Moon Remix (ft. JROA) on YouTube

2022 songs
2022 singles
Number-one singles in the Philippines